Spain competed at the 2006 Winter Olympics in Turin, Italy.

Alpine skiing 

María José Rienda entered the Olympics having won three World Cup events on the season, including the last giant slalom before the Olympic Games, but couldn't repeat this form in Turin, as she finished 13th in the giant slalom.

Note: In the men's combined, run 1 is the downhill, and runs 2 and 3 are the slalom. In the women's combined, run 1 and 2 are the slalom, and run 3 the downhill.

Biathlon 

The lone Spanish biathlete in Turin, Luis Alberto Hernando, finished 80th in the men's individual event.

Cross-country skiing 

Even after Johann Mühlegg was disqualified for doping after having won the men's 50 kilometre race, Spain's top cross-country performance was in that race, as Juan Jesús Gutiérrez finished 22nd.

Distance

Freestyle skiing 

Spain's lone competitor in the freestyle skiing events in Turin was unable to advance in the women's moguls, as she finished second last in the qualifying round.

Snowboarding 

Jordi Font was involved in a notable incident in his semifinal, as he collided with Canada's Jasey-Jay Anderson. Anderson beat Font down for second place, but the Canadian was disqualified for missing a gate, sending Font through to the final. In the final, Font again fell, but this time ended up in fourth position.

Halfpipe

Note: In the final, the single best score from two runs is used to determine the ranking. A bracketed score indicates a run that wasn't counted.

Snowboard cross

References

External links

Nations at the 2006 Winter Olympics
2006 Winter Olympics
Olympics